Tchangmargarya yangtsunghaiensis is a species of large operculate freshwater snail, an aquatic gastropod mollusk in the family Viviparidae, the river snails.

This species used to be assigned to Margarya, and is the type species of Tchangmargarya.

Distribution 
The distribution of Tchangmargarya yangtsunghaiensis includes Yangzong Lake in Yunnan Province, China.

Description 
The diploid chromosome number of Tchangmargarya yangtsunghaiensis is 2n=24. Zhang et al. (2015) provided details about the shell and about the radula.

References

Viviparidae
Taxobox binomials not recognized by IUCN